GDT may refer to:

Trails
 Great Dividing Trail, in Victoria, Australia
 Great Divide Trail, in the Canadian Rocky Mountains

Science and technology
 Gas discharge tube
 Gas Dynamic Trap, a Russian magnetic mirror used for fusion power research
 Geometric dimensioning and tolerancing, GD&T
 Global Descriptor Table, an x86 data structure
 Global distance test, to compare proteins
 Ground Data Terminal

Other uses
 Ganvsig daighix tongiong pingimv, a romanization system for Taiwanese Minnan
 Goal-directed therapy, in critical care medicine
 Gracies Dinnertime Theatre, a former student newspaper at the Rochester Institute of Technology
 Grand dictionnaire terminologique, an online terminological database
 JAGS McCartney International Airport, Turks and Caicos Islands
 Kungardutyi language
 MaK GDT, a diesel railbus
 Guillermo del Toro, director